{{DISPLAYTITLE:C29H36O8}}
The molecular formula C29H36O8 (molar mass: 512.59 g/mol, exact mass: 512.2410 u) may refer to:

 Bis-GMA (bisphenol A-glycidyl methacrylate)
 Mallotojaponin C
 Naphthablin